Nickellton is an unincorporated community in Macon County, in the U.S. state of Missouri.

History
A post office was established at Nickellton in 1883, and remained in operation until 1918. The community has the name of Davidson Nickell, an early settler.

References

Unincorporated communities in Macon County, Missouri
Unincorporated communities in Missouri